The non-marine molluscs of Indonesia are a part of the molluscan fauna of Indonesia (wildlife of Indonesia). A number of species of non-marine molluscs are found in the wild in Indonesia.

Freshwater gastropods

Neritidae
 Clithon bicolor (Récluz, 1843)
 Clithon faba (G.B. Sowerby I, 1836)
 Clithon olivaceum (Rècluz, 1843)
 Clithon oualaniensis Lesson, 1831
 Neripteron bensoni (Récluz, 1850)
 Nerita articulata Gould, 1847
 Neritina coromandeliana Sowerby, 1832
 Neritina pulligera (Linnaeus, 1767)
 Neritina sulculosa von Martens, 1875
 Neritina turrita (Gmelin, 1791)
 Neritina violacea (Gmelin, 1791)
 Neritina zigzag Lamarck, 1822
 Neritodryas subsulcata (Sowerby, 1836)
 Septaria lineata (Lamarck, 1816)

Neritiliidae
 Neritilia vulgaris Kano & Kase, 2003

Pachychilidae
 Brotia costula Brandt, 1974
 Brotia pageli (Thiele, 1908)
 Faunus ater (Linnaeus, 1758)
 Sulcospira kawaluensis Marwoto & Isnaningsih, 2012
 Sulcospira pisum (Brot, 1868)
 Sulcospira sulcospira (Mousson, 1849)
 Sulcospira testudinaria (von dem Busch, 1842)
 Tylomelania abendanoni (Kruimel, 1913)
 Tylomelania amphiderita Rintelen, Bouchet & Glaubrecht, 2007
 Tylomelania bakara Rintelen & Glaubrecht, 2003
 Tylomelania baskasti Rintelen & Glaubrecht, 2008
 Tylomelania carbo Sarasin & Sarasin, 1897
 Tylomelania carota (Sarasin & Sarasin, 1898)
 Tylomelania celebicola (Sarasin & Sarasin, 1898)
 Tylomelania centaurus (Sarasin & Sarasin, 1898)
 Tylomelania confusa Rintelen, Bouchet & Glaubrecht, 2007
 Tylomelania connectens Sarasin & Sarasin, 1898
 Tylomelania gemmifera (Sarasin & Sarasin, 1897)
 Tylomelania hannelorae Rintelen & Glaubrecht, 2008
 Tylomelania helmuti Rintelen & Glaubrecht, 2003
 Tylomelania inconspicua Rintelen, Bouchet & Glaubrecht, 2007
 Tylomelania insulaesacrae (Sarasin & Sarasin, 1897)
 Tylomelania kristinae Rintelen, Bouchet & Glaubrecht, 2007
 Tylomelania kruimeli Rintelen & Glaubrecht, 2003
 Tylomelania kuli (Sarasin & Sarasin, 1898)
 Tylomelania lalemae (Kruimel, 1913)
 Tylomelania mahalonensis (Kruimel, 1913)
 Tylomelania mahalonica (Kruimel, 1913)
 Tylomelania marwotoae Rintelen, Bouchet & Glaubrecht, 2007
 Tylomelania masapensis (Kruimel, 1913)
 Tylomelania matannensis Rintelen, Bouchet & Glaubrecht, 2007
 Tylomelania molesta (Sarasin & Sarasin, 1897)
 Tylomelania monacha (Sarasin & Sarasin, 1899)
 Tylomelania neritiformis (Sarasin & Sarasin, 1897)
 Tylomelania palicolarum (Sarasin & Sarasin, 1897)
 Tylomelania patriarchalis (Sarasin & Sarasin, 1897)
 Tylomelania perconica (Sarasin & Sarasin, 1898)
 Tylomelania perfecta (Mousson, 1849)
 Tylomelania porcellanica Sarasin & Sarasin, 1897
 Tylomelania robusta (Martens, 1897)
 Tylomelania sarasinorum (Kruimel, 1913)
 Tylomelania scalariopsis (Sarasin & Sarasin, 1897)
 Tylomelania sinabartfeldi Rintelen & Glaubrecht, 2008
 Tylomelania tominangensis (Kruimel, 1913)
 Tylomelania tomoriensis (Sarasin & Sarasin, 1898)
 Tylomelania toradjarum (Sarasin & Sarasin, 1897)
 Tylomelania towutensis (Sarasin & Sarasin, 1897)
 Tylomelania towutica (Kruimel, 1913)
 Tylomelania turriformis Rintelen, Bouchet & Glaubrecht, 2007
 Tylomelania wallacei (Reeve, 1860)
 Tylomelania wesseli Rintelen, Bouchet & Glaubrecht, 2007
 Tylomelania wolterecki Rintelen, Bouchet & Glaubrecht, 2007
 Tylomelania zeamais (Sarasin & Sarasin, 1897)

Assimineidae
 Assiminea microsculpta Nevill, 1880
 Assiminea philippinica Boettger, 1887
 Cyclotropis bedaliensis (Rensch, 1934)
 Cyclotropis carinata (Lea, 1856)
 Cyclotropis papuensis (Tapparone-Canefri, 1883)
 Cyclotropis terae Brandt, 1974
 Omphalotropis ceramensis Pfeiffer, 1862
 Paludinella halophila Rensch, 1934
 Pseudassiminea waigiouensis (Sykes, 1903)
 Pseudocyclotus rugatellus (Tapparone-Canefri, 1883)

Clenchiellidae
 Clenchiella microscopica (Nevill, 1877)

Planorbidae
 Gyraulus convexiusculus (Hutton, 1849)
 Gyraulus terraesacrae Rensch, 1934
 Intha umbilicalis (Benson, 1836)
 Miratesta celebensis P. & F. Sarasin, 1898
 Physastra moluccensis Lesson, 1831

Bulinidae
 Indoplanorbis exustus (Deshayes, 1834)

Lymnaeidae
 Austropeplea lessoni (Deshayes, 1830)
 Radix viridis (Quoy & Gaimard, 1833)

Cultelidae
 Neosolen aquaedulcioris Ghosh, 1920

Viviparidae
 Angulyagra oxytropis (Benson, 1836)
 Filopaludina martensi (Frauenfeld, 1865)
 Filopaludina sumatrensis (Dunker, 1852)
 Idiopoma javanica von dem Busch, 1844

Bithyniidae
 Gabbia lacustris Van Benthem Jutting, 1963

Iravadiidae
 Iravadia ornata Blanford, 1867
 Iravadia rohdei (Brandt, 1968)

Pomatiopsidae
 Oncomelania hupensis Gredler, 1881

Ampullariidae
 Pila ampullacea (Linnaeus, 1758)
 Pila polita (Deshayes, 1830)
 Pila scutata (Mousson, 1848)
 Pomacea canaliculata (Lamarck, 1822)
 Pomacea lineata (Spix in Wagner, 1827)

Stenothyridae
 Stenothyra cyrtochilavan Benthem Jutting, 1959
 Stenothyra glabrata (Adams, 1851)
 Stenothyra monilifera (Benson, 1856)
 Stenothyra polita A. Adams, 1851
 Stenothyra ventricosa Quoy & Gaimard, 1834

Tateidae
 Sulawesidrobia abreui Zielske, Glaubrecht & Haase, 2011
 Sulawesidrobia anceps Zielske, Glaubrecht & Haase, 2011
 Sulawesidrobia bicolor Zielske, Glaubrecht & Haase, 2011
 Sulawesidrobia datar Zielske, Glaubrecht & Haase, 2011
 Sulawesidrobia mahalonaensis Zielske, Glaubrecht & Haase, 2011
 Sulawesidrobia megalodon Zielske, Glaubrecht & Haase, 2011
 Sulawesidrobia perempuan Zielske, Glaubrecht & Haase, 2011
 Sulawesidrobia soedjatmokoi Zielske, Glaubrecht & Haase, 2011
 Sulawesidrobia towutiensis Zielske, Glaubrecht & Haase, 2011
 Sulawesidrobia yunusi Zielske, Glaubrecht & Haase, 2011

Potamididae
 Cerithium coralium Kiener, 1841
 Telescopium telescopium Linnaeus, 1758

Thiaridae
 Melanoides jugicostis (Hanley & Theobald, 1876)
 Mieniplotia scabra (Müller, 1774)
 Sermyla riqueti (Grateloup, 1840)
 Tarebia granifera (Lamarck, 1816)
 Thiara amarula (Linnaeus, 1758)
 Thiara plicaria Born, 1780
 Thiara rudicostis Brot, 1874
 Thiara rudis (Lea, 1850)

Land gastropods

Achatinellidae
 Elasmias sundanum (Möllendorff, 1897)
 Lamellidea subcylindrica (Möllendorff & Quadras, 1894)

Achatinidae
 Achatina fulica Bowdich, 1822
 Allopeas clavulinum (Potiez & Michaud, 1838)
 Allopeas gracile (Hutton, 1834)
 Glessula sumatrana (Martens, 1864)
 Paropeas achatinaceum (Pfeiffer, 1846)
 Paropeas acutissimum (Mousson, 1857)
 Subulina octona (Bruguière, 1792)

Ariophantidae
 Hemiplecta humphreysiana (Lea, 1841)
 Macrochlamys amboinensis (Martens, 1864)
 Macrochlamys spiralifer Vermeulen, 1996
 Parmarion martensi Simroth, 1893
 Parmarion pupillaris Humbert, 1929

Assimineidae
 Omphalotropis columellaris Quadras and Möllendorff, 1893

Bradybaenidae
 Bradybaena similaris (Férussac, 1821)

Camaenidae
 Amphidromus adamsi (Reeve, 1848)
 Amphidromus alticola Fulton, 1896
 Amphidromus ameliae B. Dharma, 2007
 Amphidromus banksi Butot, 1955
 Amphidromus bulowi Fruhstorfer, 1905
 Amphidromus djajasasmitai Dharma, 1993
 Amphidromus elviae Dharma, 2007
 Amphidromus elvinae Dharma, 2007
 Amphidromus enganoensis (Fulton, 1896)
 Amphidromus enganoensis fruhstorferi Laidlaw, 1954
 Amphidromus enganoensis sykesi Fruhstorfer, 1905
 Amphidromus filozonatus (von Martens, 1867)
 Amphidromus furcillatus (Mousson, 1849)
 Amphidromus heerianus (Pfeiffer, 1871)
 Amphidromus ilsa B. Rensch, 1933
 Amphidromus inversus O. F. Müller, 1774
 Amphidromus inversus andamanensis (L. Pfeiffer, 1871)
 Amphidromus javanicus (Sowerby, 1841)
 Amphidromus minutus
 Amphidromus niasensis Fulton, 1907
 Amphidromus palaceus (Mousson, 1848)
 Amphidromus palaceus lemongensis
 Amphidromus palaceus taloensis
 Amphidromus palaceus tanggamusensis
 Amphidromus perversus (Linnaeus, 1758)
 Amphidromus porcellanus (Mousson, 1848)
 Amphidromus puspae Dharma, 1993
 Amphidromus ristiae Dharma, 2007
 Amphidromus sekincauensis Thach & F. Huber, 2014
 Amphidromus semifrenatus Martens, 1900
 Amphidromus sowerby
 Amphidromus sumatranus von Martens, 1864
 Amphidromus sumatranus jacobsoni Laidlaw, 1954
 Amphidromus sumatranus singalangensis Rolle, 1908
 Amphidromus webbi Fulton, 1907
 Amphidromus webbi babiensis Laidlaw, 1954
 Amphidromus webbi simalurensis Fulton, 1907
 Chloritis breviseta (Pfeiffer, 1862)
 Chloritis crassula (Philippi, 1844)
 Chloritis fruhstorferi (Möllendorff, 1897)
 Chloritis pandjangensis Rolle, 1908
 Chloritis rufofasciata
 Chloritis sykesi Gude, 1906
 Chloritis tabularis Gude, 1903
 Chloritis tomentosa (L. Pfeiffer, 1854)
 Chloritis transversalis (Mousson, 1857)
 Ganesella acris (Benson, 1859)
 Ganesella bantamensis (E. A. Smith, 1887)
 Ganesella bottgeri H. Rolle, 1908
 Ganesella conulus
 Landouria abdidalem Nurinsiyah, Neiber & Hausdorf, 2019
 Landouria ciliocincta (Möllendorff, 1897)
 Landouria conoidea (Leschke, 1914)
 Landouria costulata (Martens, 1892)
 Landouria davini Dharma, 2015
 Landouria dharmai Nurinsiyah, Neiber & Hausdorf, 2019
 Landouria epiplatia (Möllendorff, 1897)
 Landouria intumescens (Martens, 1867)
 Landouria leucochila (Gude, 1905)
 Landouria madurensis Nurinsiyah, Neiber & Hausdorf, 2019
 Landouria menorehensis Nurinsiyah, Neiber & Hausdorf, 2019
 Landouria mentaweiensis
 Landouria monticola van Benthem Jutting, 1950
 Landouria moussoniana (Martens, 1867)
 Landouria naggsi Nurinsiyah, Neiber & Hausdorf, 2019
 Landouria nodifera Nurinsiyah, Neiber & Hausdorf, 2019
 Landouria nusakambangensis Nurinsiyah, Neiber & Hausdorf, 2019
 Landouria pacitanensis Nurinsiyah, Neiber & Hausdorf, 2019
 Landouria pakidulan Nurinsiyah, Neiber & Hausdorf, 2019
 Landouria parahyangensis Nurinsiyah, Neiber & Hausdorf, 2019
 Landouria petrukensis Nurinsiyah, Neiber & Hausdorf, 2019
 Landouria rotatoria (Pfeiffer, 1842)
 Landouria schepmani (Möllendorff, 1897)
 Landouria sewuensis Nurinsiyah, Neiber & Hausdorf, 2019
 Landouria smimensis (Mousson, 1848)
 Landouria sukoliloensis Nurinsiyah, Neiber & Hausdorf, 2019
 Landouria sumatrana (Martens, 1864)
 Landouria tholiformis Nurinsiyah, Neiber & Hausdorf, 2019
 Landouria tonywhitteni Nurinsiyah, Neiber & Hausdorf, 2019
 Landouria winteriana (Pfeiffer, 1842)
 Landouria zonifera Nurinsiyah, Neiber & Hausdorf, 2019
 Planispira aldrichi Henderson, 1898
 Planispira gabata atjehensis
 Planispira gabata smithi
 Planispira quadrivolvis (Martens, 1865)
 Pseudopartula arborascens Butot, 1954
 Pseudopartula dohertyi (Aldrich, 1892)
 Pseudopartula galericulum (Mousson, 1848)
 Pseudopartula galericulum gedeana
 Vulnus wallacei

Cerastidae
 Rhachistia zonulata (Pfeiffer, 1846)

Charopidae
 Discocharopa aperta (Möllendorff, 1888)
 Philalanka kusana (Aldrich, 1889)
 Philalanka nannophya Rensch, 1932
 Philalanka thienemanni Rensch, 1932
 Philalanka tjibodasensis (Leschke, 1914)

Chronidae
 Kaliella barrakporensis (Pfeiffer, 1852)

Clausiliidae
 Juttingia (Pseudohemiphaedusa) loosjesi Nordsieck, 2002
 Juttingia schlueteri (O. Boettger, 1879)
 Oospira acehensis Dharma & Szekeres, 2009
 Oospira butoti Grego & Szekeres, 2009
 Oospira cornea (Küster, 1844)
 Oospira dancei Dharma & Szekeres, 2009
 Oospira jacobsoni (Loosjes, 1953)
 Oospira javana (Pfeiffer, 1841)
 Oospira orientalis (L. Pfeiffer, 1842)
 Oospira salacana (Boettger, 1890)
 Oospira scalariformis (Loosjes, 1953)
 Oospira thrausta (Loosjes, 1953)
 Paraphaedusa schwaneri (E. Martens, 1867)
 Phaedusa dorsoplicata Loosjes, 1953
 Phaedusa timorensis Nordsieck, 2007

Cyclophoridae
 Alycaeus crenilabris Möllendorff, 1897
 Alycaeus crenilabris crenilabris Möllendorff, 1897
 Alycaeus crenilabris laevis van Benthem Jutting, 1959
 Alycaeus crenilabris latecostatus van Benthem Jutting, 1959
 Alycaeus liratulus (Preston, 1907)
 Alycaeus praetextus van Benthem Jutting, 1959
 Alycaeus reinhardti sabangensis (B. Rensch, 1933)
 Alycaeus sumatranus (Martens, 1900)
 Alycaeus wilhelminae Maassen, 2006
 Chamalycaeus crassicollis van Benthem Jutting, 1959
 Chamalycaeus fruhstorferi (Möllendorff, 1897)
 Chamalycaeus longituba (Martens, 1864)
 Crossopoma albersi (L. Pfeiffer, 1847)
 Crossopoma bathyrhaphe (E. A. Smith, 1878)
 Crossopoma cornuvenatorium (Gmelin, 1791)
 Crossopoma enganoense Henderson, 1898
 Crossopoma inflamatum
 Crossopoma nieli van Benthem Jutting, 1959
 Crossopoma planorbulum (Lamarck, 1816)
 Crossopoma spiroliratus
 Cyclohelix crocata jacobsoni
 Cyclohelix kibleri (Fulton, 1907)
 Cyclohelix kibleri babiensis Laidlaw, 1957
 Cyclohelix kibleri simalurensis Laidlaw, 1957
 Cyclohelix nicobarica Pfeiffer, 1865
 Cyclotus amboinensis (Pfeiffer, 1854)
 Cyclotus batchianensis Pfeiffer, 1861
 Cyclotus bialatus Möllendorff, 1902
 Cyclotus corniculum (Mousson, 1849)
 Cyclotus discoideus G. B. Sowerby I, 1843
 Cyclotus discriminendus B. Rensch, 1934
 Cyclotus lepidotus Vermeulen, 1996
 Cyclotus lombockensis (Smith, 1898)
 Cyclotus mindaiensis (Bock, 1881)
 Cyclotus natunensis Smith, 1894
 Cyclotus niasensis Fulton, 1907
 Cyclotus politus (G. B. Sowerby I, 1843)
 Cyclotus pyrostoma Smith, 1896
 Cyclotus rostellatus (L. Pfeiffer, 1851)
 Cyclotus simplicissimus B. Rensch, 1933
 Cyclotus subflammulatus Pfeiffer, 1861
 Cyclotus sumatranus (Martens, 1864)
 Cyclotus vicinus Smith, 1896
 Cyclophorus courbeti Ancey, 1888
 Cyclophorus egregius Martens, 1900
 Cyclophorus eximius
 Cyclophorus eximius rouyeri
 Cyclophorus hebereri B. Rensch, 1933
 Cyclophorus ouwensianus
 Cyclophorus perdix (Broderip & G. B. Sowerby I, 1830)
 Cyclophorus perdix aquilus
 Cyclophorus perdix bankanus
 Cyclophorus rafflesi (Broderip & Sowerby, 1833)
 Cyclophorus schepmani Laidlaw, 1957
 Cyclophorus taeniatus (L. Pfeiffer, 1855)
 Cyclophorus tuba (G. B. Sowerby I, 1842)
 Cyclophorus tuba plicifera
 Dicharax longituba (Martens, 1867)
 Ditropopsis aenigmatica (van Benthem Jutting, 1963)
 Ditropopsis alta Greke, 2014
 Ditropopsis benthemjuttingi Greke, 2011
 Ditropopsis fruhstorferi (Möllendorff, 1897)
 Ditropopsis fultoni E. A. Smith, 1897
 Ditropopsis halmaherica Greke, 2014
 Ditropopsis heterospirifera (van Benthem Jutting, 1958)
 Ditropopsis ingenua (O. Boettger, 1891)
 Ditropopsis magna Greke, 2014
 Ditropopsis majalibit Greke, 2014
 Ditropopsis mirabilis Greke, 2011
 Ditropopsis moellendorffi (O. Boettger, 1891)
 Ditropopsis monticola Greke, 2014
 Ditropopsis obiensis Greke, 2011
 Ditropopsis pallidioperculata Greke, 2014
 Ditropopsis papuana E. A. Smith, 1897
 Ditropopsis perlucidula (Greke, 2011)
 Ditropopsis pyramis Greke, 2014
 Ditropopsis spiralis (O. Boettger, 1891)
 Ditropopsis tamarau Greke, 2014
 Ditropopsis telnovi Greke, 2014
 Ditropopsis tritonensis Greke, 2011
 Ditropopsis unicarinata Greke, 2014
 Ditropopsis waigeoensis Greke, 2014
 Ditropopsis wallacei Greke, 2014
 Japonia ciliferum (Mousson, 1849)
 Japonia ciliocinctum (von Martens, 1865)
 Japonia convexum Möllendorff, 1897
 Japonia garreli (Eydoux & Souleyet, 1852)
 Japonia grandipilum Boettger, 1891
 Japonia marangense
 Japonia mundum
 Japonia obliquistriatum Bullen, 1904
 Japonia townsendi (Crosse, 1879)
 Leptopoma altum Möllendorff, 1897
 Leptopoma bodjoense E. A. Smith, 1888
 Leptopoma bodjoense mentaweiense
 Leptopoma fultoni Aldrich, 1898
 Leptopoma niasense H. C. Fulton, 1907
 Leptopoma perlucidum (de Grateloup, 1840)
 Leptopoma sericatum (L. Pfeiffer, 1853)
 Leptopoma vitreum (Lesson, 1826)
 Opisthoporus corniculum (Mousson, 1849)
 Pincerna yanseni Páll-Gergely, 2017
 Pterocyclos aspersus Bullen, 1906
 Pterocyclos celebensis (Smith, 1896)
 Schistoloma sumatranum (Dohrn, 1881)
 Schistoloma sectilabrum (Gould, 1843)
 Theobaldius dautzenbergi (Fulton, 1907)

Diplommatinidae
 Arinia yanseni Nurinsiyah & Hausdorf, 2017
 Diplommatina auriculata Möllendorff, 1897
 Diplommatina diplostoma B. Rensch, 1931
 Diplommatina duplicilabra van Benthem Jutting, 1948
 Diplommatina halimunensis Nurinsiyah & Hausdorf, 2017
 Diplommatina heryantoi Nurinsiyah & Hausdorf, 2017
 Diplommatina hortulana Leschke, 1914
 Diplommatina jonabletti Greke, 2017
 Diplommatina kakenca Nurinsiyah & Hausdorf, 2017
 Diplommatina majapahit Greke, 2019
 Diplommatina mongondowensis Maassen, 2007
 Diplommatina nevilli (Crosse, 1879)
 Diplommatina planicollis Möllendorff, 1897
 Diplommatina riedeli Maassen, 2007
 Diplommatina ristiae Nurinsiyah & Hausdorf, 2017
 Diplommatina soputensis Sarasin & Sarasin, 1899
 Diplommatina stenoacron Vermeulen & Khalik, 2021
 Diplommatina strophosa Benthem-Jutting, 1959
 Diplommatina tardigrada Benthem-Jutting, 1959
 Diplommatina tweediei Laidlaw, 1949
 Plectostoma kitteli (Maassen, 2002)

Dyakiidae
 Dyakia clypeus (Mousson, 1857)
 Dyakia rumphii (von dem Busch, 1842)
 Elaphroconcha bataviana (von dem Busch, 1842)
 Elaphroconcha javacensis (Férussac, 1821)
 Elaphroconcha patens (Martens, 1898)

Ellobiidae
 Auriculastra subula (Qouy & Gaimard, 1832)
 Cylindrotis quadrasi Moellendorff, 1895
 Ellobium aurisjudae Linnaeus, 1758
 Ellobium aurismidae Röding, 1798
 Laemodonta bella (H. & A. Adams, 1855)
 Laemodonta punctigera (H. & A. Adams, 1854)
 Melampus sincaporensis Pfeiffer, 1855
 Melampus sulculosus von Martens, 1865

Enidae
 Apoecus glandula (Mousson, 1848)
 Apoecus tenggericus (Möllendorff, 1897)
 Ena glandula A. Mousson, 1848

Euconulidae
 Coneuplecta microconus (Mousson, 1865)
 Coneuplecta olivacea Vermeullen, 1996
 Coneuplecta sitaliformis (Möllendorff, 1897)
 Lamprocystis infans (L. Pfeiffer, 1854)
 Liardetia angigyra (Möllendorff, 1897)
 Liardetia convexoconica (Möllendorff, 1897)
 Liardetia dolium (Pfeiffer, 1846)
 Liardetia pisum (Möllendorff, 1897)
 Liardetia scandens (Cox, 1872)
 Microcystina chionodiscus Vermeulen, 1996
 Microcystina circumlineata (Möllendorff, 1897)
 Microcystina fruhstorferi (Möllendorff, 1897)
 Microcystina gratilla Van Benthem-Jutting, 1950
 Microcystina sinica Möllendorff, 1885
 Microcystina subglobosa Möllendorff, 1897
 Queridomus fimbriosus (Quadras & Möllendorff, 1894)

Ferussaciidae
 Geostilbia aperta (Swainson, 1840)

Gastrocoptidae
 Gastrocopta pediculus (Shuttleworth, 1852)
 Gastrocopta recondita (Tapparone-Canefri, 1883)
 Gastrocopta servilis (Gould, 1843)

Helicarionidae
 Helicarion albellus von Martens, 1867
 Helicarion perfragilis Möllendorff, 1897
 Helicarion radiatulus (Möllendorff, 1897)
 Sundavitrina fruhstorferi (Möllendorff, 1897)

Helicinidae
 Geophorus oxytropis (Gray, 1839)

Hydrocenidae
 Georissa williamsi Godwin-Austen, 1889

Philomycidae
 Meghimatium striatum van Hasselt, 1824

Punctidae
 Paralaoma javana (Möllendorff, 1897)

Pupinidae
 Pupina bipalatalis Boettger, 1890
 Pupina compacta (Möllendorff, 1897)
 Pupina junghuni Martens, 1867
 Pupina treubi Boettger, 1890
 Pupina verbeeki Möllendorff, 1897

Streptaxidae
 Gulella bicolor (Hutton, 1834)

Succineidae
 Succinea listeri Smith, 1888
 Succinea minuta Martens, 1867

Trochomorphidae
 Geotrochus bicolor (Martens, 1864)
 Geotrochus conus (Philippi, 1841)
 Trochomorpha appropinquata (Martens, 1864)
 Trochomorpha bicolor Martens, 1864
 Trochomorpha concolor Boettger, 1890
 Trochomorpha strubelli Boettger, 1890
 Videna strubelli Boettger, 1890

Truncatellidae
 Truncatella guerinii Villa & Villa, 1841

Valloniidae
 Pupisoma dioscoricola (C. B. Adams, 1845)
 Pupisoma orcula (Benson, 1850)

Veronicellidae
 Filicaulis bleekerii (Keferstein, 1865)
 Laevicaulis alte (Férussac, 1822)
 Sarasinula plebeia (P. Fischer, 1868)

Vertiginidae
 Gyliotrachela fruhstorferi (Möllendorff, 1897)
 Nesopupa malayana (Issel, 1874)
 Nesopupa nannodes (Quadras and Möllendorff, 1898)
 Nesopupa novopommerana Rensch, 1932

Freshwater bivalves

Cyrenidae
 Corbicula fluminea (Müller, 1774)
 Corbicula lamarckiana Prime, 1864
 Corbicula loehensis Kruimel, 1913
 Corbicula matannensis Sarasin & Sarasin, 1898
 Corbicula moltkiana Prime, 1878
 Corbicula possoensis (Sarasin & Sarasin, 1898)
 Polymesoda bengalensis (Lamarck, 1818)

Mytilidae
 Brachidontes arcuatulus Hanley, 1844

Unionidae
 Physunio superbus (Lea, 1843)
 Pilsbryoconcha exilis (Lea, 1838)
 Pseudodon mouhotii (Lea, 1863)
 Pseudodon vondembuschianus (Lea, 1840)
 Rectidens sumatrensis Dunker, 1852
 Sinanodonta woodiana (Lea, 1834)
 Trapezoideus misellus Morelet, 1865
 Uniandra contradens Lea, 1838
 Uniandra semmelinki von Martens, 1891

Sphaeriidae
 Pisidium annandalei Prashad, 1925
 Pisidium javanum van Benthem Jutting, 1931
 Pisidium sumatranum Martens, 1897

See also

 List of marine molluscs of Indonesia

Lists of non-marine molluscs of surrounding countries:
 List of non-marine molluscs of Australia
 List of non-marine molluscs of East Timor
 List of non-marine molluscs of Malaysia
 List of non-marine molluscs of Papua New Guinea
 List of non-marine molluscs of the Philippines
 List of non-marine molluscs of Singapore

References

Molluscs
Indonesia